The 2008 Singapore Super Series was the fifth tournament of 2008 BWF Super Series badminton tournament. It was held from June 10 to June 15, 2008, at the Singapore Indoor Stadium in Singapore.

Final results

Men's singles

Women's singles

Men's doubles

Women's doubles

Mixed doubles

External links
Singapore Super Series 2008 at tournamentsoftware.com

Singapore Open (badminton)
Open Super Series
Singapore